Lonicera interrupta, commonly known as chaparral honeysuckle, is a species of plant found in the western United States. It is native to chaparral and mixed forest habitats in the foothills and mountain ranges of California, and to some mountains in Arizona.

Description
Lonicera interrupta is a hardy shrub with a woody trunk. It is quite drought-tolerant.

It sends up spiked inflorescences of yellow honeysuckle flowers. Each flower is about a centimeter long, with prominent stamens extending from the rolled-back lips. The flowers are attractive to hummingbirds.

The fruits are red, spherical, and shiny.

External links
Jepson Manual Treatment of Lonicera interrupta
Lonicera interrupta — UC Photos gallery

interrupta
Flora of California
Flora of Arizona
Natural history of the California chaparral and woodlands
Flora of the Cascade Range
Flora of the Klamath Mountains
Flora of the Sierra Nevada (United States)
Natural history of the California Coast Ranges
Natural history of the Peninsular Ranges
Natural history of the San Francisco Bay Area
Natural history of the Santa Monica Mountains
Natural history of the Transverse Ranges
Bird food plants
Flora without expected TNC conservation status